Carew & Co (Bangladesh) Ltd.  is the only licensed distillery producing alcohol made from sugar molasses in Bangladesh and is located at Darshana, Chuadanga, Khulna Division, Bangladesh. It is the only distillery in Bangladesh owned by the Government Of Bangladesh. It is located inside Darsana Sugar Mills compound and is under the authority of Bangladesh Sugar and Food Industries Corporation. It is one of the 15 sugar mills owned by Bangladesh Sugar and Food Industries Corporation that makes a profit.

History 
Carew & Co (Bangladesh) Ltd. traces its origin to the distillery established by the British businessman John Maxwell in 1803. He built the distillery in Kanpur, Uttar Pradesh, British India. The first distillery in the subcontinent. The distillery was successful and started making profits for Maxwel. He hired Robert Russell Carew, spirits specialist. Carew was impressed by the result and bought out the factory with two other investors. Carew hired his younger brother as the manager. His brother died in the Indian Sepoy Mutiny in 1857.

After the mutiny, Carew reopened the distillery with the support of British Army. The company became a joint-stock company in 1897. He opened branches in Asansol, Katni, and Darsana (East Bengal, which became East Pakistan in 1947). The equipment in the factories were made in Glasgow, Scotland. In 1971 East Pakistan became independent Bangladesh after the Bangladesh Liberation War. The government of Bangladesh nationalised the distillery at Darsana in 1973 which became Carew & Co. (Bangladesh) Ltd.

The distillery is a profit making company of the government and pays taxes to it as well. It has a 20 feet security wall and strong security system. It makes two kinds of liquor, domestic one using indigenous recipes and foreign ones that do not use indigenous recipes. It has 200 distribution agents and 13 country liquor distribution agents. It is also the largest producer of ethanol in Bangladesh.

Products
 Fine Brandy
 Cherry Brandy
 Yellow Label Malted Whiskey
 Imperial Whiskey
 Old Rum
 Rosa Rum
 Gold Riband Gin
 Orange Curaçao
 Tsarina Vodka (AKA Jorina Vodka)

References

Government-owned companies of Bangladesh
1938 establishments in India
Chuadanga District
Sugar mills in Bangladesh
Alcohol in Bangladesh
Indian companies established in 1938
Food and drink companies established in 1938